Angelus "Ange" de Baets (24 November 1793 in Evergem – 24 April 1855 in Ghent) was a Belgian painter of portraits and architectural subjects. He was born at Everghem in 1793. He executed a great number of pictures, most of them views in Ghent and its environs, which are much esteemed. He died at Ghent in 1855.

Notes

References
Ange de Baets at the Netherlands Institute for Art History.

Attribution:
 

1793 births
1855 deaths
Belgian painters
People from Evergem